This is a list of 249 species in the genus Promachus, giant robber flies.

Promachus species

 Promachus abdominalis Ricardo, 1920 c g
 Promachus aberrans Paramonov, 1931 c g
 Promachus absterrens Oldroyd, 1960 c g
 Promachus acuminatus (Hobby, 1936) c g
 Promachus adamsii Ricardo, 1920 [= apicalis Adams, 1905 (Homonym)] c g
 Promachus addens (Walker, 1861) c g
 Promachus aedithus (Walker, 1849) c g
 Promachus aegyptiacus Efflatoun, 1929 c g
 Promachus aequalis Loew, 1858 c g
 Promachus albicauda Wulp, 1872 c g
 Promachus albicinctus Ricardo, 1900 c g
 Promachus albifacies Williston, 1885 i c g b
 Promachus albitarsatus (Macquart, 1834) c g
 Promachus albopilosus (Macquart, 1855) c g
 Promachus aldrichii Hine, 1911 i c g b
 Promachus amastrus (Walker, 1849) c g
 Promachus amorges (Walker, 1849) c g
 Promachus anceps Osten Sacken, 1887 c g
 Promachus anicius (Walker, 1849) c g
 Promachus annularis (Fabricius, 1805) c g
 Promachus apicalis (Macquart, 1838)
 Promachus apivorus (Walker, 1860) c g
 Promachus argentipennis Efflatoun, 1929 c g
 Promachus argentipes Meijere, 1913 c g
 Promachus argyropus Bezzi, 1906 c g
 Promachus ater Coquillett, 1898 c g
 Promachus atrox Bromley, 1940 i c g b
 Promachus aurulans Lindner, 1955 c g
 Promachus barbatus (Doleschall, 1857) c g
 Promachus bastardii (Macquart, 1838) i c g b  (false bee-killer)
 Promachus beesoni Ricardo, 1921 c g
 Promachus bellaridi Martin, 1965 c g
 Promachus bifasciatus (Macquart, 1838) c g
 Promachus binghamensis Ricardo, 1921 c g
 Promachus binucleatus Bezzi, 1908 c g
 Promachus bomensis Curran, 1927 c g
 Promachus bottegoi Corti, 1895 c g
 Promachus brevipennis Ricardo, 1920 c g
 Promachus breviusculus Walker, 1855 c g
 Promachus breviventris Ricardo, 1920 c g
 Promachus caffer (Macquart, 1846) c g
 Promachus calanus (Walker, 1851) c g
 Promachus calcaratus (Hobby, 1936) c g
 Promachus calorificus (Walker, 1859) c g
 Promachus canus (Wiedemann, 1818) c g
 Promachus captans (Walker, 1851) c g
 Promachus carpenteri (Hobby, 1936) c g
 Promachus ceylanicus (Macquart, 1838) c g
 Promachus chalcops Speiser, 1910 c g
 Promachus chinensis Ricardo, 1920 c g
 Promachus cinctus Bellardi, 1861 c g
 Promachus cinereus Ricardo, 1925 c g
 Promachus clausus (Macquart, 1846) c g
 Promachus clavigerus Bromley, 1931 c g
 Promachus complens (Walker, 1861) c
 Promachus condanguineus (Macquart, 1838) c g
 Promachus conradti (Hobby, 1936) c g
 Promachus consanguineus (Macquart, 1838) g
 Promachus contractus (Walker, 1851) c g
 Promachus contradicens (Walker, 1858) c g
 Promachus cornutus (Hobby, 1936) c g
 Promachus cothurnatus (Bigot, 1859) c g
 Promachus crassifemoratus (Hobby, 1936) c g
 Promachus cristatus Oldroyd, 1960 c g
 Promachus cypricus (Rondani, 1856) c g
 Promachus desmopygus Meijere, 1914 c g
 Promachus dimidiatus Curran, 1927 i c g
 Promachus djanetianus Seguy, 1938 c g
 Promachus doddi Ricardo, 1913 c g
 Promachus duvaucelii (Macquart, 1838) c
 Promachus entebbensis (Hobby, 1936) c g
 Promachus enucleatus Karsch, 1888 c g
 Promachus erythrosceles (Hobby, 1936) c g
 Promachus fasciatus (Fabricius, 1775) c g
 Promachus felinus Wulp, 1872 c g
 Promachus fitchii Osten Sacken, 1878 i c g b
 Promachus flavifasciatus (Macquart, 1838) c g
 Promachus flavopilosus Ricardo, 1920 c g
 Promachus floccosus Kirby, 1884 c g
 Promachus forcipatus Schiner, 1868 c g
 Promachus forfex Osten Sacken, 1887 c g
 Promachus formosanus Matsumura, 1916 c g
 Promachus foromosanus Matsumura, 1916 g
 Promachus fraterculus (Walker, 1855) c g
 Promachus fulvipes (Macquart, 1838) c
 Promachus fulviventris (Becker, 1925) c g
 Promachus fuscifemoratus Joseph & Parui, 1981 c g
 Promachus fuscipennis (Macquart, 1846) c
 Promachus fusiformis (Walker, 1856) c g
 Promachus genitalis Joseph & Parui, 1987 c g
 Promachus ghumtiensis Bromley, 1935 c g
 Promachus giganteus Hine, 1911 i c g b
 Promachus gomerae Frey, 1936 c g
 Promachus gossypiatus Speiser, 1910 c g
 Promachus gracilis (Macquart, 1838) c g
 Promachus graeffi Schmeltz, 1866 c g
 Promachus grandis (Macquart, 1838) c g
 Promachus griseiventris Becker & Stein, 1913 c g
 Promachus grisiventris Becker, 1913 c g
 Promachus guineensis (Wiedemann, 1824) c g
 Promachus hastatus (Hobby, 1936) c g
 Promachus heteropterus (Macquart, 1838) c
 Promachus hinei Bromley, 1931 i c g b
 Promachus hirsutus Ricardo, 1925 c g
 Promachus hirtiventris (Macquart, 1850) c
 Promachus horichanus Matsumura, 1916 g
 Promachus horishanus Matsumura, 1916 c g
 Promachus horni Bromley, 1935 c g
 Promachus hypocaustus Oldroyd, 1972 c g
 Promachus incisuralis (Macquart, 1838) c g
 Promachus indicus Joseph & Parui, 1987 c g
 Promachus indigenus (Becker, 1925) c g
 Promachus inoratus Wulp, 1872 c g
 Promachus inornatus Wulp, 1872 c g
 Promachus jabalpurensis Joseph & Parui, 1981 c g
 Promachus knutsoni Joseph & Parui, 1987 c g
 Promachus laciniosus Becker, 1907 c g
 Promachus lateralis (Walker, 1860) c g
 Promachus latitarsatus (Macquart & Berthelot, 1839) c g
 Promachus lehri Joseph & Parui, 1987 c g
 Promachus lemur Bromley, 1931 c g
 Promachus leoninus Loew, 1848 c g
 Promachus leontochlaenus Loew, 1871 c g
 Promachus leucopareus Wulp, 1872 c g
 Promachus leucopygus (Walker, 1857) c g
 Promachus leucotrichodes Bigot, 1892 c g
 Promachus lineosus (Walker, 1857) c g
 Promachus longius (Chou & Lee, 1991) g
 Promachus macquartii (Rondani, 1848) c
 Promachus maculatus (Fabricius, 1775) c g
 Promachus maculosus (Macquart, 1834) c g
 Promachus madagascarensis Bromley, 1942 c g
 Promachus magnus Bellardi, 1861 i c g
 Promachus manilliensis (Macquart, 1838) c g
 Promachus marcii (Macquart, 1838) c g
 Promachus mediospinosus Speiser, 1913 c g
 Promachus melampygus Wulp, 1872 c g
 Promachus mesacanthus (Hobby, 1936) c g
 Promachus mesorrhachis (Hobby, 1936) c g
 Promachus metoxus (Oldroyd, 1939) c g
 Promachus microlabis Loew, 1857 c g
 Promachus minusculus Hine, 1911 i c g
 Promachus mitescens (Walker, 1851) c g
 Promachus mixtus (Hobby, 1936) c g
 Promachus mustela Loew, 1854 c g
 Promachus neavei (Hobby, 1936) c g
 Promachus negligens Adams, 1905 c g
 Promachus nicobarensis Schiner, 1868 c g
 Promachus nigrbarbatus (Becker, 1925) g
 Promachus nigrialbus Martin, 1970 i c g b
 Promachus nigribarbatus (Becker, 1925) c g
 Promachus nigripes (Fabricius, 1787) c g
 Promachus nigropennipes Hobby, 1933 c g
 Promachus nigropilosus Schaeffer, 1916 i g
 Promachus niveicinctus (Hobby, 1936) c g
 Promachus nobilis Osten Sacken, 1887 c g
 Promachus noninterponens Ricardo, 1920 c g
 Promachus noscibilis Austen, 1915 c g
 Promachus nussus Oldroyd, 1972 c g
 Promachus obscuripes Ricardo, 1920 c g
 Promachus obscurus Joseph & Parui, 1987 c g
 Promachus oklahomensis Pritchard, 1935 i c g
 Promachus opacus Becker, 1925 c g
 Promachus orientalis (Macquart, 1838) c g
 Promachus ovatus Martin, 1967 c g
 Promachus painteri Bromley, 1934 i c g b
 Promachus pallidus Ricardo, 1921 c g
 Promachus pallipennis (Macquart, 1855) c g
 Promachus palmensis Frey, 1936 c g
 Promachus parvus Bromley, 1931 c g
 Promachus perfectus (Walker, 1851) c g
 Promachus perpusilla (Walker, 1851) c g
 Promachus philipinus Ricardo, 1920 c g
 Promachus pictus Meigen, 1820
 Promachus plutonicus (Walker, 1861) c g
 Promachus poetinus (Walker, 1849) c g
 Promachus pontifex Karsch, 1888 c g
 Promachus princeps Williston, 1885 i c g b
 Promachus productus (Walker, 1851) c g
 Promachus promiscuus (Hobby, 1936) c g
 Promachus pseudocontractus Joseph & Parui, 1993 c g
 Promachus pseudomaculatus Ricardo, 1920 c g
 Promachus pulchellus Bellardi, 1861 c g
 Promachus punctatostriata (Schrank, 1803) g
 Promachus quadratus (Wiedemann, 1821) i c b
 Promachus quatuorlineatus (Macquart, 1838) c g
 Promachus ramakrishnai Bromley, 1939 c g
 Promachus rapax Gerstaecker, 1871 c g
 Promachus raptor Austen, 1915 c g
 Promachus rectangularis Loew, 1854 c g
 Promachus rex Karsch, 1888 c g
 Promachus robertii (Macquart, 1838) c g
 Promachus rondanii Oldroyd, 1975 c g
 Promachus rubripes (Macquart, 1834) c
 Promachus rueppelli Loew, 1854 c
 Promachus rufescens Ricardo, 1920 c g
 Promachus rufibarbis (Macquart, 1848) c
 Promachus rufihumeralis Hobby, 1933 c g
 Promachus rufimystaceus (Macquart, 1850) c g
 Promachus rufipes (Fabricius, 1775) i c g b  (red-footed cannibalfly)
 Promachus rufoangulatus (Macquart, 1838) c g
 Promachus rufotibialis (Hobby, 1936) c g
 Promachus sackeni Hine, 1911 i c g b
 Promachus scalaris Loew, 1858 c g
 Promachus scotti (Oldroyd, 1940) c g
 Promachus scutellatus (Macquart, 1834) c
 Promachus senegalensis (Macquart, 1838) c g
 Promachus simpsoni Ricardo, 1920 c g
 Promachus sinaiticus Efflatoun, 1934 c g
 Promachus smithi Parui & Joseph, 1994 c g
 Promachus snowi (Hobby, 1940) c g
 Promachus sokotrae Ricardo, 1903 c g
 Promachus speiseri (Hobby, 1936) c
 Promachus spissibarbis (Macquart, 1846) c g
 Promachus subsitula (Walker, 1851) c g
 Promachus subtilis Bromley, 1935 c g
 Promachus superfluus Oldroyd, 1972 c g
 Promachus taiwanensis (Chou & Lee, 1991) g
 Promachus tasmanensis (Macquart, 1847) c g
 Promachus testacipes (Macquart, 1855) c g
 Promachus tewfiki Efflatoun, 1929 c g
 Promachus tewfikis Efflatoun, 1929 c g
 Promachus texanus Bromley, 1934 i c g
 Promachus titan (Carrera, 1959) c g
 Promachus transactus (Walker, 1864) c g
 Promachus transvaalensis Hobby, 1933 c g
 Promachus trichonotus (Wiedemann, 1828) c g
 Promachus trichozonus Loew, 1858 c g
 Promachus triflagellatus Frey, 1923 c g
 Promachus tristis Bigot, 1892 c g
 Promachus truquii Bellardi, 1861 i c g b
 Promachus turinus (Walker, 1849) c g
 Promachus ugandiensis Ricardo, 1920 c g
 Promachus varipes (Macquart, 1838) c
 Promachus venatrix (Hobby, 1936) c g
 Promachus venustus Carrera & Andretta, 1950 c g
 Promachus versicolor (Hobby, 1936) c g
 Promachus vertebratus (Say, 1823) i c g b
 Promachus vexator Becker, 1908 c g
 Promachus viridiventris (Macquart, 1855) c g
 Promachus westermannii (Macquart, 1838) c g
 Promachus wiedemanni Schiner, 1867 c g
 Promachus wollastoni (Hobby, 1936) c g
 Promachus xanthostoma Wulp, 1872 c g
 Promachus xanthotrichus Bezzi, 1908 c g
 Promachus yepezi (Carrera & Machado-Allison, 1963) c g
 Promachus yerburiensis Ricardo, 1920 c g
 Promachus yesonicus Bigot, 1887 c g
 Promachus zenkeri (Hobby, 1936) c g

Data sources: i = ITIS, c = Catalogue of Life, g = GBIF, b = Bugguide.net

References

Promachus